is a Japanese retired track and field sprinter who specialized in the 200 metres. She competed in the 4 × 100 metres relay at the 2011 World Championships. She also won a bronze medal at the 2011 Asian Championships in the 200 metres and a gold medal in the 4 × 100 metres relay.

Personal bests

International competition

National titles

References

External links

Saori Imai at JAAF 

1990 births
Living people
Japanese female sprinters
Sportspeople from Nagano Prefecture
World Athletics Championships athletes for Japan
Shigakkan University alumni
21st-century Japanese women